All the Greatest Hits, is the first compilation album released by British band McFly. Released on 5 November 2007, two editions of the album were available, one including fourteen tracks, featuring a selection of the group's best singles, and one including twenty-two tracks, including all of the group's singles, plus a couple of B-sides and remixes. There are also three new songs featured on the album: "The Heart Never Lies", "Don't Wake Me Up", and "The Way You Make Me Feel". The album was certified as Gold in the UK, and has sold over 500,000 copies worldwide. McFly revealed in the compilation's booklet that it wasn't their idea to release a Greatest Hits album, and that they are still not keen on the idea.

Track listing

Chart performance

Weekly charts

Year-end charts

Certifications

See also 
 All the Greatest Hits

References 

2007 greatest hits albums
McFly compilation albums
Albums produced by Hugh Padgham
Albums produced by Jason Perry